Dale Mitchell may refer to:

 Dale Mitchell (baseball) (1921–1987), American baseball player
 Dale Mitchell (soccer) (born 1958), Canadian soccer player
 Dale Mitchell (ice hockey) (born 1989), Canadian ice hockey player